The Jiangle dialect is a dialect of Shao-Jiang Min Chinese spoken in Jiangle, Sanming in northwestern Fujian province, China. It combines elements from Northern Min and Hakka Chinese.

Phonology
The Jiangle dialect has 19 initials, 36 rimes and 7 tones.

Initials

Rimes

Tones

References

Min Chinese